Soapkills or Soap Kills (in Arabic  الصابون يقتل read as "As-Saboun Yaqtol") is an  indie electro-pop band based in Lebanon. The group was formed in October 1997 when Zeid Hamdan and Yasmine Hamdan, both born in Beirut in 1976 but not related, decided to explore and combine their interest in classical Arabic song and electronic music.

History
A cult group in Lebanon, Soapkills drew inspiration from both classical Arab music and the new electro scene blossoming in the Middle East. French media have described them as "Trip hop à l'orientale"  The band's name was initially that of a song written by Zeid Hamdan, and according to him referred to the reconstruction of Beirut after the Lebanese Civil War: "We thought that at the time, in the context of Beirut being ... you know, reborn, and all the war being wiped clean, we thought, wow, it's shiny and it's awful and it's soap kills. We thought it would be a nice name for a band." The group's sound was initially dominated by a Roland MC-303 Groovebox, which Zeid Hamdan had acquired to replace musicians after the dissolution of Lombrix, a rock band that he had founded in the mid-1990s with Yasmine Hamdan and others.

The band appeared on several compilations, recorded the albums Bater (2001, for which it was joined by Rabih Mroué and Walid Sadek playing flute and trumpet) and Cheftak (2002), and performed in Paris, Berlin, Syria, Algeria, Congo, Egypt, Jordan, Lebanon, and Sydney.

In 2005, Soapkills released their last album to date, entitled Enta Fen. The album featured new materials as well as remixes of their previous songs. In 2007, the band was mentioned in Time as part of "small but artistically significant rock scene" in Beirut.

Solo projects
Yasmine Hamdan and Zeid Hamdan both started working on solo projects. Zeid went on to form a band called The New Government, while Yasmine met with the producer Mirwais. Together, they formed the duo Y.A.S. The project places Arabic lyrics at the center of electronic beats, and the album Arabology was released in France in March 2009. Yasmine went on to release her first solo album, entitled Ya Nass, which came out internationally in 2013 on Crammed Discs.

In 2008 there were talks about a Best Of album, consisting of Zeid & Yasmine's most popular tracks. The project was finally carried out with and released on Crammed Discs in 2015.

In popular culture
Soapkills were featured in the soundtracks of many feature films in Lebanon including  A Perfect Day (2005) by Khalil Joreige and Joana Hadjithomas. One of their songs is the main theme of What Shoes (2006), a short by Gregory Buchakjian.

In 2002, Soapkills collaborated with artist Lamia Joreige and choreographer Makram Hamdan for the Bater Dance Project a multimedia installation and performance.

Discography
Albums
Bater (2001)
Cheftak (2002)
Enta Fen (2005)

Compilation albums
The Best of Soapkills (2015)

Extended plays
Lost (1998)
Live at Circus (1999)

References

External links

Official blog

Lebanese pop music groups
Electronic music duos
Musical groups established in 1998
Male–female musical duos